Chlorops is a genus of fly in the family Chloropidae.

Species

C. adjunctus Becker, 1910
C. adamsi Sabrosky, 1935
C. alpicolus Becker, 1910
C. amabilis Duda, 1933
C. angustifrons Becker, 1910
C. annulipes Macquart, 1835
C. anthracophagoideus Strobl, 1901
C. atra Macquart, 1851
C. babosae Dely-Draskovits, 1978
C. bohemicus Zuska, 1960
C. brevifrons Loew, 1866
C. brunnipennis Becker, 1912
C. calceatus Meigen, 1830
C. centromaculatus (Duda, 1933)
C. certima Adams, 1904
C. cinerapennis Adams, 1903
C. cinerellus Séguy, 1934
C. constricta Becker, 1912
C. crocota Loew, 1863
C. dasycerus Loew, 1866
C. declinata (Becker, 1912)
C. dissimulans (Duda, 1933)
C. egregia Becker, 1912
C. emiliae Smirnov, 1967
C. fasciatus Meigen, 1830
C. figuratus (Zetterstedt, 1848)
C. finitimus Becker, 1910
C. flavipilus Smirnov, 1964
C. frontosus Meigen, 1830
C. geminatus Meigen, 1830
C. genarum Becker, 1912
C. gracilis Meigen, 1830
C. hypostigma Meigen, 1830
C. infumatus (Becker, 1910)
C. interruptus Meigen, 1830
C. kirigaminensis Kanmiya, 1978
C. laccatus Nartshuk, 2002
C. laetus Meigen, 1830
C. laevis Becker, 1912
C. languida Becker, 1912
C. lasciva Adams, 1904
C. limbatus Meigen, 1830
C. liturata Adams, 1903
C. longipalpis (Duda, 1933)
C. longulus Meigen, 1838
C. marchali Mesnil in Balachowki & Mesnil, 1935
C. meigenii Loew, 1866
C. melanocera Loew, 1863
C. nigrimanus Macquart, 1835
C. nigripalpis (Duda, 1933)
C. nigroscutellatus (Duda, 1933)
C. novakii Strobl, 1902
C. oblita Becker, 1912
C. obscurellus (Zetterstedt, 1838)
C. obscuricornis Loew, 1863
C. oryzae (Matsumura, 1915) Rice stem maggot
C. pallidiventris (Duda, 1933)
C. pallifrons Strobl, 1909
C. palpalis Adams, 1903
C. palpatus Smirnov, 1959
C. pannonicus Strobl, 1893
C. pennatus (Duda, 1933)
C. perflava Walker, 1849
C. planifrons (Loew, 1866)
C. producta Loew, 1863
C. proximus Say, 1830
C. pubescens Loew, 1863
C. pumilionis (Bjerkander, 1778)
C. puncticornis Loew, 1866
C. quercophila Beschovski, 1979
C. rectinervis Becker, 1912
C. ringens Loew, 1866
C. riparius Smirnov, 1958
C. rossicus Smirnov, 1955
C. rubicunda Adams, 1903
C. rubrivittata Adams, 1904
C. rufescens Coquillett, 1910
C. rufinus (Zetterstedt, 1848)
C. rufiventris Macquart, 1835
C. ruginosa Becker, 1912
C. sabulona Becker, 1912
C. sahlbergii Loew, 1863
C. scalaris Meigen, 1830
C. scutellaris (Zetterstedt, 1838)
C. seminigra Becker, 1912
C. serenus Loew, 1866
C. signatus Dely-Draskovits, 1978
C. socia Becker, 1912
C. sordidella Becker, 1912
C. speciosus Meigen, 1830
C. stigmata Becker, 1912
C. stigmaticalis Becker, 1912
C. strigulus (Fabricius, 1794)
C. subnigra Coquillett, 1910
C. sulphurea Loew, 1863
C. suturalis Séguy, 1934
C. tarsalis Becker, 1912
C. tectifrons Becker, 1910
C. testacea Macquart, 1851
C. triangularis Becker, 1910
C. troglodytes (Zetterstedt, 1848)
C. varsoviensis Becker, 1910
C. zernyi (Duda, 1933)

References

Europe
Nearctic

Chloropinae
Chloropidae genera
Articles containing video clips